Ibrahim Adamu (born 26 November 1981) is a Nigerian badminton player. In 2003, he won the gold medal at the All-Africa Games in men's doubles event partnered with Greg Orobosa Okuonghae.

Achievements

All-Africa Games 
Men's doubles

Mixed doubles

African Championships 
Men's singles

Men's doubles

Mixed doubles

BWF International Challenge/Series 
Men's doubles

 BWF International Challenge tournament
 BWF International Series tournament
 BWF Future Series tournament

References

External links
 

Adamu, Ibrahim
Living people
Nigerian male badminton players
Competitors at the 2003 All-Africa Games
Competitors at the 2007 All-Africa Games
Competitors at the 2011 All-Africa Games
African Games gold medalists for Nigeria
African Games silver medalists for Nigeria
African Games bronze medalists for Nigeria
African Games medalists in badminton
21st-century Nigerian people